Wendy Fix Shpiz (born January 31, 1975) is an American former professional tennis player.

Biography
Fix, who grew up in Winnetka, IL, was the 1992 Illinois state singles champion. Prior to turning professional she played college tennis at Duke University and earned All-American honors in 1997.

On the professional tour, Fix reached a best singles ranking of 250 in the world and was a doubles quarter-finalist at the Kuala Lumpur WTA Tour tournament in 1999. She featured in both the singles and doubles qualifying draws for the 2000 Wimbledon Championships. Retiring from the tour in 2000, she later took up the sport of paddle tennis.

ITF Circuit finals

Singles: 2 (1–1)

Doubles: 4 (3–1)

References

External links
 
 

1975 births
Living people
American female tennis players
Tennis people from Illinois
People from Winnetka, Illinois
Duke Blue Devils women's tennis players